Balance & Options is the fifth album by West Coast rapper and producer, DJ Quik. It was released on May 16, 2000 on Arista Records (who inherited DJ Quik's contract when they bought Profile Records). The album debuted at number 18 on the U.S. Billboard 200 chart, with 68,000 copies in its first-week of sales. It was his first album not certified by the RIAA. It features the single "Pitch in on a Party" whose video was directed by photographer Patrick Hoelck.

Despite the fans claiming Balance & Options was his best work, DJ Quik felt he wasn't giving his all on this album. He was losing interest in recording due to the changing trends in the music industry at the time.

Critical reception

Balance & Options received rave reviews from contemporary music critics. Incognito from DubCNN gave the album 4.5/5 stars and wrote "On his latest effort "Balance & Options", Quik is wiser and is able to admit that he aint no gangsta. There is nothin wrong with that, Quik can still rock the parties and get respect from peeps on the streets. I really like this record, songs like "Change The Game", "Pitch in on a Party" and "Well" really mean a lot. The Beats really make the record, though I still love it, I think it deserves a 4/5 because of incredible production and deep meaning. With this album, Quik has again shown us how he has established himself as a key factor in the West coast". Rolling Stone gave the album 3.5/5 stars and wrote "...Could be the most unexpectedly progressive hip-hop album of the year." The Source gave the album 3/5 mics and wrote "...The gems of BALANCE are scattered like buried treasure, weighing heavily toward the LP's end. When you hear the stronger cuts, you realize BALANCE's potential..."

Nathan Rabin from The A.V. Club wrote that "Balance & Options, like his stellar Rhythm-al-ism, finds the rapper-producer moving away from gangsta-oriented lyrics in favor of a more self-consciously "positive" worldview. Balance & Options finds the occasional socially conscious lyric mingling freely with rampant misogyny and homophobia—sometimes within the same song—that's too pervasive and persistent to be incidental. The album gets off to a good start and scatters strong moments throughout. "Sexuality" isn't exactly progressive, but its dense P-Funk groove is undeniable, while "Do Whatchu Want" showcases Quik and Digital Underground at their irreverent best. The instrumental "Quik's Groove" is sure-footed enough to buck the self-indulgence that plagues most instrumentals by rappers, while the melancholy "Tha Divorce Song," co-written and sung by James DeBarge, hints at intellectual and emotional growth. Balance & Options is a mixed bag, but Quik is such a talented producer that even when he's not at his best, he's still superior to the vast majority of his peers.

Accolades 
In 2012, Kendrick Lamar included the album on his "Complex Top 25 Favorite Albums" list and wrote that "My homeboy Earl would play that album all day. One of the first songs on there ‘I Don’t Wanna Party Wit U’ is one I could remember that really jumps out to me and really gave me that feel. It was summertime, we was running around and that was always playing.”

Commercial performance 
The album debuted at number 18 on the US Billboard 200 and number 5 on the US Top R&B/Hip-Hop Albums, selling 68,000 copies in its first week. It spent 18 weeks on the Billboard 200. As of March 21, 2002 the album has sold over 324,000 copies in the United States. It was his first album not certified by the RIAA.

Track listing 

Note
 (co.) Co-producer

Sample credits
"Pitch In Ona Party" contains sample of "We Still Party" - earlier Quik's track, from his previous album "Rhythm-al-ism".
"You Ain't Fresh" contains portions of "You Ain't Fresh" by Boogie Boys.
"Quikker Said Than Dunn" contains samples of "Eazy-er Said Than Dunn" by Eazy-E.
"Do Whatcha Want" contains samples of "Let's Have Some Fun" by The Bar-Kays.

Personnel 
Credits for Balance & Options adapted from AllMusic.

 AMG –  performer, primary artist
 Courtney Branch –  performer, primary artist
 El DeBarge – guest artist, vocals
 James DeBarge –  performer, primary artist
 Digital Underground –  performer, primary artist
 DJ Quik – bass,  featured artist, guest artist, performer, primary artist
 Brian Gardner – mastering
 Will Hudspeth – featured artist
 Kam – featured artist
 Jonathan Mannion – photography
 Marco Polo – background vocals
 Mausberg –  performer, primary artist
 Raphael Saadiq – featured artist, primary artist
 Erick Sermon –  performer, primary artist
 Skaboobie – featured artist
 Suga Free –  performer, primary artist
 Charles Veal – concert master
 Courtney Walter – design
 Warryn Campbell –  producer
 Benjamin Wright – orchestral arrangements

Charts

References 

2000 albums
DJ Quik albums
Albums produced by Courtney Branch
Albums produced by DJ Quik
Albums produced by G-One
Albums produced by Warryn Campbell
Arista Records albums
West Coast hip hop albums